Jose Bernardo may refer to:

José Bernardo (race driver), Portuguese rally driver in 1973 Rallye de Portugal
José-Miguel Bernardo (born 1950), Spanish mathematician and statistician
José Bernardo Sánchez (1778–1833), Spanish missionary
José Carlos Bernardo, Brazilian footballer

See also